Whitelaw is a surname. Notable people with the surname include:

 Alexander Whitelaw, Conservative MP
 Billie Whitelaw, actress
 David Whitelaw, writer
Graeme Whitelaw, politician
 Paul Whitelaw, cricketer
 Sonny Whitelaw, novelist, photographer and freelance journalist
 Vicki Whitelaw (born 1977), Australian road cyclist
 William Whitelaw, 1st Viscount Whitelaw, politician

English-language surnames